Absheron-Khizi Economic Region is one of the 14 economic regions of Azerbaijan. It borders the economic regions of Shirvan-Salyan, Mountainous Shirvan, Guba-Khachmaz, and Baku. The region consists of the districts of Absheron, Khizi and the city of Sumgait. Its population was estimated to be at 578.8 thousand people in January 2021.

History 
Absheron-Khizi Economic Region was established on 7 July 2021 as part of a reform of the economic region system of Azerbaijan. Its territory was part of the larger Absheron Economic Region prior to 2021.

References 

Economic regions of Azerbaijan